Growth factor, augmenter of liver regeneration (ERV1 homolog, S. cerevisiae), also known as GFER, or Hepatopoietin is a protein which in humans is encoded by the GFER gene. This gene is also known as essential for respiration and vegatative growth, augmenter of liver regeneration, and growth factor of Erv1-like/Hepatic regenerative stimulation substance.

Structure 
The GFER gene is located on the p arm of chromosome 16 at position 13.3 and it spans 3,600 base pairs. The GFER gene produces a 15.4 kDa protein composed of 130 amino acids. The structure of the protein is a homodimer which has been found to be fairly similar to the scERV1 protein of yeast.

Genomics 

The gene resides on chromosome 16 in the interval containing the locus for polycystic kidney disease (PKD1). The putative gene product is 42% similar to the scERV1 protein of yeast. The human gene has three exons: the first encodes a 5' untranslated region and the first part of the protein; the second encodes the bulk of the protein; and the third the remainder.

Molecular biology 

Proteins of the ERV1/ALR family are encoded by all eukaryotes and cytoplasmic DNA viruses for which the sequence data are available. All possess a C-X-X-C motif within a ~100 amino acid domain

Function 

The hepatotrophic factor designated augmenter of liver regeneration (ALR) is thought to be one of the factors responsible for the extraordinary regenerative capacity of mammalian liver. It has also been called hepatic regenerative stimulation substance (HSS). The yeast scERV1 gene had been found to be essential for oxidative phosphorylation, the maintenance of mitochondrial genomes, and the cell division cycle. The human gene is both the structural and functional homolog of the yeast scERV1 gene.

This protein interacts with Mia40 during the import of intermembrane space proteins including the small Tim proteins Cox17 and Cox19 both of which have disulfide bonds.

Clinical Significance

Mutations in GFER has been shown to result in Myopathy, mitochondrial progressive, with congenital cataract, hearing loss and developmental delay (MPMCHD). MPMCHD is a disease characterized by progressive myopathy and partial combined respiratory-chain deficiency, congenital cataract, sensorineural hearing loss, and developmental delay.

Interactions 

GFER has been shown to interact with COP9 constitutive photomorphogenic homolog subunit 5 and BNIPL.

References

Further reading